A taxonomic database is a database created to hold information on biological taxa – for example groups of organisms organized by species name or other taxonomic identifier – for efficient data management and information retrieval. Taxonomic databases are routinely used for the automated construction of biological checklists such as floras and faunas, both for print publication and online; to underpin the operation of web-based species information systems; as a part of biological collection management (for example in museums and herbaria); as well as providing, in some cases, the taxon management component of broader science or biology information systems. They are also a fundamental contribution to the discipline of biodiversity informatics.

Goal 
The goal of a taxonomic database is (or should be) to accurately model the characteristics of interest that are relevant to the organisms which are in scope for the intended coverage and usage of the system. For example, databases of fungi, algae, bryophytes and vascular plants ("higher plants") would need to encode conventions from the International Code of Botanical Nomenclature while their counterparts for animals and most protists would encode equivalent rules from the International Code of Zoological Nomenclature; in both cases modelling the relevant taxonomic hierarchy for any taxon is a natural fit with the relational model employed in almost all database systems. In addition to encoding organism identifiers (most frequently a combination of scientific name, author, and – for zoological taxa – year of original publication), a taxonomic database may frequently incorporate additional taxonomic information such as synonyms and taxonomic opinions, literature sources or citations, plus a range of biological of attributes as desired for each taxon such as geographic distribution, ecology, descriptive information, threatened or vulnerable status, etc.

History 
Possibly the earliest documented management of taxonomic information in computerised form comprised the taxonomic coding system developed by Richard Swartz et al. at the Virginia Institute of Marine Science for the Biota of Chesapeake Bay and described in a published report in 1972. This work led directly or indirectly to other projects with greater profile including the NODC Taxonomic Code system which went through 8 versions before being discontinued in 1996, to be subsumed and transformed into the still current Integrated Taxonomic Information System (ITIS). A number of other taxonomic databases specializing in particular groups of organisms that appeared in the 1970s through to the present jointly contribute to the Species 2000 project, which since 2001 has been partnering with ITIS to produce a combined product, the Catalogue of Life. While the Catalogue of Life currently concentrates on assembling basic name information as a global species checklist, numerous other taxonomic database projects such as Fauna Europaea, the Australian Faunal Directory, and more supply rich ancillary information including descriptions, illustrations, maps, and more. Many taxonomic database projects are currently listed at the TDWG "Biodiversity Information Projects of the World" site.

Issues 
The representation of taxonomic information in machine-encodable form raises a number of issues not encountered in other domains, such as variant ways to cite the same species or other taxon name, the same name used for multiple taxa (homonyms), multiple non-current names for the same taxon (synonyms), changes in name and taxon concept definition through time, and more. One forum that has promoted discussion and possible solutions to these and related problems since 1985 is the Biodiversity Information Standards (TDWG), originally called the Taxonomic Database Working Group.

See also 
 List of biodiversity databases
 Biological classification
 Darwin Core, a body of standards for sharing machine-readable taxonomic data on biodiversity
 Pan-European Species directories Infrastructure

References 

Catalogues
Information science
Database